Fanny Sidney (born Fanny Mauferon; April 5, 1987) is a French actress and director.

Career 
Sidney was born on April 5, 1987, in Paris. She attended the Conservatoire Municipal Hector Berlioz (2005-2006) then took part in the free class of Cours Florent (2006-2009) before joining the "Direction" section of La Fémis (2011-2015). She is particularly known for her role as Camille Valentini in the series Call My Agent!. In 2019, she announced that she was pregnant with her first child.

Filmography

Cinema 
 2005 : Claudia disparue by Serge Roullet 
 2008 : La Neige au village by Martin Rit
 2008 : L'Ennemi public n°1  : Sabrina Mesrine
 2008 : Avoue que tu mens by Serge Roullet
 2010 : Poème pour Louis, short film by  Thomas Gendreau : Anna 
 2011 : Soulwash, short film by  Douglas Attal : Flora 
 2012 : Populaire by Régis Roinsard  : the fan of the regional championship
 2012 : À l'ombre du palmier, short film by  Bruno Veniard : Juliette
 2013 : Pan, short film by Frédéric Bayer Azem
 2014 : F.A.N., short film by Hugo Becker 
 2014 : Respire by Mélanie Laurent : Isa
 2014 : Hippocrate by Thomas Lilti : Estelle
 2014 : Tu veux ou tu veux pas by Tonie Marshall : Véronique
 2015 : On verra bien si on se noie, short film by Hugo Becker : Valentine 
 2015 : Madame petite, short film by  Fanny Sidney
 2016 : Aucun regret, short film by Emmanuel Mouret : Célia
 2019 : Allée des Jasmins, short film by  Stéphane Ly-Cuong : Mademoiselle Sidzina
 2019 : Selfie by Thomas Bidegain, Marc Fitoussi, Tristan Aurouet, Cyril Gelblat et Vianney Lebasque : Emma

Television 
 2005 : Diane, femme flic, episode Affaire sous X directed by Dominique Tabuteau : Anna Vignes
 2005 : Confessions d'un menteur by Didier Grousset : Vanessa
 2006 : Madame la Proviseure], episode Chacun sa chance and Le Secret de madame Jaubert directed by Philippe Bérenger : Clémentine Garcia
 2006 : Passés troubles by Serge Meynard : Julie
 2006 : Commissaire Moulin, episode La Dernière Affaire directed by Yves Rénier : Véronique Léonard
 2007 : Sur le fil, episode Torts exclusifs directed by Frédéric Berthe :  Anna Masset
 2008 - 2015 : Hard series created by Cathy Verney : Violette Rousseau
 2008 : RIS police scientifique, episode Chasse à l'homme directed by Alain Choquart : Mathilde
 2008 : Guy Môquet, un amour fusillé by Philippe Bérenger : Jacky
 2013 : Casting(s) (series, saison 2) created by Pierre Niney et Ali Marhyar
 2015 - 2020 : Call My Agent! : Camille Valentini
 2017 : Calls, episode 1|16/11/2028 - Appels téléphoniques (Paris - New York) directed by Timothée Hochet : Laura

As director 
 2014 : Kick Off (short film)
 2015 : Madame petite (short film)
 2016 : Ugh (short film)
 2017 : Loulou, episodes Séance photo and Le Club des femmes

As screenwriter 
 2015 : Madame petite (short film) of herself
 2017 : Le Ticket (short film) by Ali Marhyar

Theater 
 2007 : Si ce n'est toi by Edward Bond
 2009 : On ne badine pas avec l'amour by Alfred de Musset
 2009-2011 : Le Dindon de Georges Feydeau

References

External links
 

French film actresses
French women film directors
Cours Florent alumni
1987 births
Actresses from Paris
Living people